Stadt und Land Wohnbauten GmbH is a German state-owned public housing company which manages properties in Berlin and Brandenburg.

Operations
The company, which was founded in 1924, manages more than 42,000 residential apartments and 700 commercial properties. It also owns a further 9,000 residential apartments which are managed by third parties.

The company aims to ensure Berliners of all income levels are able to afford to live in the city.

References

External links

1924 establishments in Germany
German companies established in 1924
Government agencies established in 1924
Government of Berlin
Housing in Germany